Imad Faraj (born 11 February 1999) is a French professional footballer who plays as a midfielder for Cypriot club AEK Larnaca.

Club career
Faraj made his professional debut for Lille in a Ligue 1 2–0 loss to SM Caen on 20 August 2017.

On 31 July 2020, Faraj joined Belgian First Division A club Mouscron on a one-year deal.

On 16 August 2021, he signed a one-year contract with AEK Larnaca in Cyprus, with an option for a second year.

International career
Faraj was born in France and is of Moroccan and Algerian descent. He is a former youth international for France.

Personal life
Faraj is the older brother of Algerian youth international footballer Samy Faraj.

Career statistics

References

External links
 
 
 
 
 

1999 births
People from Croix, Nord
Sportspeople from Nord (French department)
French sportspeople of Algerian descent
French sportspeople of Moroccan descent
Living people
French footballers
Association football midfielders
France youth international footballers
Iris Club de Croix players
Lille OSC players
Belenenses SAD players
Royal Excel Mouscron players
AEK Larnaca FC players
Ligue 1 players
Championnat National 2 players
Primeira Liga players
Belgian Pro League players
Cypriot First Division players
French expatriate footballers
Expatriate footballers in Portugal
French expatriate sportspeople in Portugal
Expatriate footballers in Belgium
French expatriate sportspeople in Belgium
Expatriate footballers in Cyprus
French expatriate sportspeople in Cyprus
Footballers from Hauts-de-France